The Detroit Cyclecar was a cyclecar manufactured in Detroit, Michigan by the Detroit Cyclecar Company from 1913 to 1914 and Saginaw, Michigan in 1914.

History 
The cyclecar, also marketed as the Detroit Speedster and Little Detroit Speedster, was designed by Ernest Weigold, former engineer for the  E.R. Thomas Motor Company, and chief engineer for Herreshoff.

The car was a side by side two-seat roadster on a 92-inch wheelbase.

In 1914 the company relocated to Saginaw, Michigan, where A. R. Thomas promoted a new cyclecar company. The car was built at the Brooks Manufacturing Company factory and known as the Saginaw Speedster for a short time.

References

Defunct motor vehicle manufacturers of the United States
Motor vehicle manufacturers based in Michigan
Cyclecars
Defunct manufacturing companies based in Delaware
Brass Era vehicles
1910s cars
Vehicle manufacturing companies established in 1913
Vehicle manufacturing companies disestablished in 1914
Cars introduced in 1913